Emperor's Return is the second release by the Swiss extreme metal band Celtic Frost. It was released in 1985 as an extended play and was their first record featuring American drummer Reid Cruickshank (a.k.a. "Reed St. Mark"). The band's bleak publicity photographs from this period had an influence on the fashion and style of the developing black metal genre. The tracks of Emperor's Return were remastered and re-released in the 1999 edition of Morbid Tales and yet again remastered and included in the 2017 edition of To Mega Therion.

Track listing

Personnel 
Celtic Frost
Tom G. Warrior – guitars, vocals, effects
Martin Ain – bass, co-producer
Reed St. Mark – drums

Production
Andrew Loyd – producer
Horst Müller – engineer
Karl Walterbach – technician
Phil Lawvere – cover art

References 

Celtic Frost albums
Noise Records EPs
1985 EPs
Black metal EPs
Death metal EPs
Enigma Records EPs
Metal Blade Records EPs